Abigail Hardingham (born circa 1991) is a British actress. Hardingham's roles include Alice Webster in the BBC Drama The Missing (2016) and Holly in the British horror comedy film Nina Forever. In 2015, Hardingham was awarded "Most Promising Newcomer" by the British Independent Film Awards.

Early life and education

Hardingham's stepfather is in the Royal Air Force and as a child, her family was stationed in Germany, where she lived for three years. She calls herself a "military brat." Hardingham expressed at age ten, to her mother, that she wanted to try acting. Her mother enrolled her in an acting club, which resulted in Hardingham hiring an agent. Her first acting job was when she was eleven. Hardingham lived in High Wycombe and when she was sixteen, she moved to London so she could pursue her acting career.

Career
In 2015, Hardingham was named "Most Promising Newcomer" by the British Independent Film Awards.

Filmography

References

External links
 

21st-century British actresses
Living people
1991 births
Actresses from London
21st-century English women
21st-century English people